Garcha is a village in Shaheed Bhagat Singh Nagar district of Punjab State, India. The village is administrated by Sarpanch an elected representative of the village.

Demography 
As of 2011, Garcha has a total number of 454 houses and population of 2078 of which 1031 include are males while 1047 are females according to the report published by Census India in 2011. The literacy rate of Garcha is 82.02%, higher than the state average of 75.84%. The population of children under the age of 6 years is 170 which is 8.18% of total population of Garcha, and child sex ratio is approximately 910 as compared to Punjab state average of 846.

Most of the people are from Schedule Caste which constitutes 45.28% of total population in Garcha. The town does not have any Schedule Tribe population so far.

As per the report published by Census India in 2011, 630 people were engaged in work activities out of the total population of Garcha which includes 580 males and 50 females. According to census survey report 2011, 90.95% workers describe their work as main work and 9.05% workers are involved in Marginal activity providing livelihood for less than 6 months.

Education 
The village has a Punjabi medium, co-ed primary and a high school founded in 1972. The schools provide mid-day meal. The school provide free education to children between the ages of 6 and 14 as per Right of Children to Free and Compulsory Education Act. KC Engineering College and Doaba Khalsa Trust Group Of Institutions are the nearest colleges.

Transport 

See also 
List of villages in India

References

External links 
 Tourism of Punjab
 Census of Punjab
 Locality Based PINCode

Villages in Shaheed Bhagat Singh Nagar district